Adam Scott Mathieson Duncan (2 November 1888 – 3 October 1976) was a Scottish football player and manager, who played as an outside right. He made over 100 appearances for Rangers, played in England for Newcastle United, winning the Football League title in 1908–09. He also had three spells with Dumbarton, and played for Cowdenbeath and guested for Celtic. As a manager, he led Hamilton Academical and Cowdenbeath before going to England, where he managed Manchester United and then Ipswich Town, the latter for 18 years.

Career

Playing career
Born in Dumbarton, Duncan was working as a law clerk when he joined his home-town club Dumbarton in 1906. He moved to Newcastle United in March 1908 for a fee of £200. A versatile forward, although primarily an outside-right, he scored 12 times in 81 league games for the Magpies and was a member of the 1908–09 English Football League championship winning side.

In May 1913, he returned to Scotland, moving to Rangers for a fee of £750. He remained with Rangers during World War I, in which he served as a signalling instructor in the Royal Field Artillery. He also played two wartime games for Celtic. In 1918 he rejoined Dumbarton and in the 1920 close season signed for Cowdenbeath. In 1922 he rejoined Dumbarton for a third time, but retired at the end of the 1922–23 season.

Managerial and coaching career
Duncan was appointed as secretary-manager of Hamilton Academical in the summer of 1923. He left in October 1925 to take over as secretary-manager of Cowdenbeath and had seven successful years at the club, keeping them in the Scottish First Division throughout his time in charge.

In June 1932 he was appointed as secretary-manager of Manchester United. Despite spending a lot of money on players, United were almost relegated to the Third Division in the 1933–34 season. However, Duncan turned things around and led United to the Second Division championship in the 1935–36 season. However, they were relegated the following season and, in November 1937, he resigned to become manager of Ipswich Town, who were then a Southern League side.

At the end of the 1938–39 season Ipswich were elected into the English Football League despite finishing third in the Southern League. Duncan remained with Ipswich Town as manager for 18 years, winning the Third Division (South) title in the 1953–54 season. However, Town were relegated the following season and Duncan stood down as manager in August 1955 season when Alf Ramsey took over. He remained as secretary for three further years.

He was honoured with a testimonial match at the end of the 1957–58 season against Norwich City at Portman Road, which Ipswich won 3–1.

He returned to live in Scotland in his retirement until his death in 1976, at the age of 87.

Honours

As a player
Newcastle United
First Division: 1908–09
FA Charity Shield: 1909

As a manager
Manchester United
Second Division: 1935–36

Ipswich Town
Division Three South: 1953–54

Managerial statistics

See also
Played for Celtic and Rangers

References

External links
 
 Manager's profile at Pride of Anglia (fansite)

1888 births
1975 deaths
Scottish footballers
Dumbarton F.C. players
Newcastle United F.C. players
Rangers F.C. players
Celtic F.C. players
Cowdenbeath F.C. players
Celtic F.C. wartime guest players
Scottish football managers
Hamilton Academical F.C. managers
Cowdenbeath F.C. managers
Manchester United F.C. managers
Ipswich Town F.C. managers
Scottish soldiers
Royal Field Artillery soldiers
British Army personnel of World War I
Scottish Football League managers
Sportspeople from Dumbarton
Footballers from West Dunbartonshire
Association football outside forwards
Clydebank Juniors F.C. players
Glasgow United F.C. players
Scottish Junior Football Association players